Cyril Cassese (born December 10, 1972 in Toulon, France) is a former professional footballer. He played as a striker.

External links
Cyril Cassese profile at chamoisfc79.fr

1972 births
Living people
French footballers
Association football forwards
SC Toulon players
En Avant Guingamp players
Olympique Alès players
Chamois Niortais F.C. players
FC Istres players
Stade de Reims players
Ligue 1 players
Ligue 2 players